Custódio José de Melo (9 June 1840 – 15 March 1902) was a Brazilian admiral and politician. He led the Brazilian fleet in two naval revolts in 1891 and 1893.

References

External links
 Relatório apresentado ao Vice-presidente da República dos Estados Unidos do Brasil pelo Ministro de Estado dos Negócios da Marinha, contra-almirante Custódio José de Melo, May 1892  (Portuguese)
 Relatório apresentado ao Vice-presidente da República dos Estados Unidos do Brasil pelo Ministro de Estado dos Negócios da Marinha, contra-almirante Custódio José de Melo, April 1893  (Portuguese)

1840 births
1902 deaths
Foreign ministers of Brazil
Brazilian admirals
Brazilian monarchists
People from Salvador, Bahia